Monique Orphé (born 15 October 1964 in Saint-Denis, Réunion) is a French politician. A member of the Socialist Party (PS), she was a Deputy in the National Assembly from Réunion between 2012 and 2017.

Biography 
Teacher by profession, Monique Orphé was elected to the Regional Council of Réunion in 2004.

Nominated as a candidate in Réunion's 1st constituency for the 2007 legislative election, with Gilbert Annette as her replacement, she withdrew her candidacy in favour of Annette. A municipal councillor of Saint-Denis since 1995, she became the first deputy mayor to Gilbert Annette following the 2008 municipal elections.

During the second round of the 2012 legislative election, she was elected Deputy of the newly created 6th constituency of Réunion with 58.9% of the vote. A member of the Social Affairs Committee, she supported the El Khomri law in 2016.

She supported Emmanuel Macron during the 2017 presidential election. As a result of her support for Macron, she was refused the nomination of the PS during the 2017 legislative election, which she lost during the second round to Nadia Ramassamy (LR).

A candidate during the 2021 departmental election in the Canton of Saint-Denis-1 with Gérard Françoise, she finished first in the first round with 54.6% of votes cast, but a high abstention rate didn't permit the pairing to be directly elected. The Socialist Party pairing went on to win the second round of voting with 56.3% of votes cast.

References

1964 births
Living people
Members of the Regional Council of Réunion
Women from Réunion in politics
People from Saint-Denis, Réunion
21st-century French women politicians
20th-century French women politicians
Black French politicians
Women members of the National Assembly (France)
Deputies of the 14th National Assembly of the French Fifth Republic
Socialist Party (France) politicians
Members of Parliament for Réunion